The Toyota-Denso Cup - World Oza was an international Go competition, sponsored by auto maker Toyota and parts manufacturer Denso.

Outline
The World Oza, sponsored by ToyotaDenso of Japan, was regarded as the newest international tournament, the first sponsored by a Japanese company.

32 players were invited from the following countries/regions:
10 from  Japan
7 from  China
7 from  South Korea
1 from  Chinese Taipei
3 from Europe
2 from North America
3 from the rest of Asia/Oceania/Africa
1 from South America

The tournament was held every 2 years. The first rounds were knockouts, and the final match is a best-of-three. The winner's purse is 30,000,000 Yen ($285,000) and a new Toyota car that is worth almost 10,000,000 Yen ($95,000).

As of June 16, 2009, the Nihon Ki-in has confirmed that the Toyota & Denso Cup World Go Oza has been canceled by the sponsors.

Winners & runners-up

International Go competitions